Colfax Township is one of seventeen townships in Boone County, Iowa, USA.  As of the 2000 census, its population was 746.

History
Colfax Township was organized in 1871. It is named for Schuyler Colfax.

Geography
According to the USGS, it contains one cemetery, Olive Branch.

References

External links
 US-Counties.com
 City-Data.com

Townships in Boone County, Iowa
Townships in Iowa
1871 establishments in Iowa